"He Lives" is a Christian hymn, otherwise known by its first line, "I Serve a Risen Savior". It was composed in 1933 by Alfred Henry Ackley (1887-1960), and remains popular today within most of the body of Christ. It is not delegated to a specific denomination, nor should it be represented as such. 

The hymn discusses the experience of Christian believers that Jesus Christ lives within their hearts, which is scriptural in the Word of God: “I am crucified with Christ; and it is no longer I who live, but it is Christ who lives in me.”—Galatians 2:20, and “That Christ may make His home in your hearts through faith.”—Ephesians 3:17. The fundamental foundation is the word "faith".  Christian believers, through faith understand it is a holy experience given by God, not just a "feeling", nor is it limited to a denomination.

The hymn is disliked or excluded by some who believe the song endorses a subjective appeal to experience, which is less reliable than the words of scripture.

Uses in other media
The hymn is sung by church members in Oranges Are Not the Only Fruit, a screen adaptation of Jeanette Winterson's novel of the same name.

References

External links
Lyrics and melody (MIDI)

American Christian hymns
1933 songs
Songs about Jesus
20th-century hymns